Jim Thomas (1930–February 2009) was an American poet, and professor at Truman State University, from 1964 to 1994.

He served in the United States Army in the Korean War, retiring as a lieutenant colonel in the National Guard.

Works
Seed Time, Harvest Time, Thomas Jefferson University Press, 1990, 
Brief Tracks, Truman State University Press, 2009,

References

External links
"Dr. Nick Knight Shares Poetry Created by Jim Thomas", PoetSpeak, April 2008

American male poets
1930 births
2009 deaths
Truman State University faculty
United States Army personnel of the Korean War
20th-century American poets
20th-century American male writers